Cheeks Nunatak is the largest and southernmost of three nunataks located  northwest of the Merrick Mountains, in Palmer Land. It was mapped by the United States Geological Survey from surveys and from U.S. Navy air photos, 1961–67, and named by the Advisory Committee on Antarctic Names for Noble L. Cheeks, aviation electronics technician, member of the R4D party that flew to the vicinity of the eventual Eights Station in 1961 to set up a base camp.

References 

Nunataks of Palmer Land